Mumford Independent School District is a public school district based in the community of Mumford, Texas (USA).

The district has currently two campuses - Mumford High School and Mumford Elementary. These are housed in four buildings: The High School building serves grades 8 to 12 and houses the main gymnasium, the Destefano-Scamardo building serves grades 6-7, the Elementary building serves grades 3 to 5 and is home to the administrative staff, and the Collier-Foyt building which serves Pre-K 3 to 2nd grade and also houses the second smaller gymnasium and the music hall.

In 2009, the school district was rated "exemplary" by the Texas Education Agency.

In 2018, Mumford Elementary was named a Blue Ribbon School by U.S. Department of Education.

The district has been featured by the Texas Public Policy Foundation for its high academic achievement while maintaining extremely conservative finances and a very lean overhead.  The district has only eight administrative and professional staff (including the school secretary and administrative assistant) and 21 total non-teaching staff while having 37 teachers and ten teachers aides. Also, the district has no outstanding debt and enough cash reserve to operate for three years. Despite the lack of financial spending, and with a high percentage of economically-disadvantaged students (75.9 percent compared to 60.4 statewide), students scored higher than average on the SAT (1459 vs. the statewide average of 1422, with Hispanic students average even better at 1463).

References

External links
Mumford ISD

School districts in Robertson County, Texas